Mariano Dámaso Beraun District is one of six districts of the province Leoncio Prado in Peru.

See also 
 Pumarinri

References